Sun Rui (born 14 May 1982), also known by the Western name Sunny Sun, is a Chinese retired ice hockey player, currently serving as assistant coach of the Chinese women's national team and the KRS Vanke Rays in the Zhenskaya Hockey League (ZhHL). She was a member of the Chinese national team during 1998 to 2015 and competed with the team in many international tournaments, including in the women's ice hockey tournament at the 2010 Winter Olympics.

References

External links 
 
 

1982 births
Living people
Chinese women's ice hockey players
Edmonton Chimos players
Ice hockey players at the 2002 Winter Olympics
Ice hockey players at the 2010 Winter Olympics
Olympic ice hockey players of China
Sportspeople from Harbin
Asian Games gold medalists for China
Asian Games bronze medalists for China
Medalists at the 1999 Asian Winter Games
Medalists at the 2003 Asian Winter Games
Medalists at the 2007 Asian Winter Games
Medalists at the 2011 Asian Winter Games
Ice hockey players at the 1999 Asian Winter Games
Ice hockey players at the 2003 Asian Winter Games
Ice hockey players at the 2007 Asian Winter Games
Ice hockey players at the 2011 Asian Winter Games
Asian Games medalists in ice hockey